Cristian Ceballos Prieto (born 3 December 1992) is a Spanish professional footballer who plays as an attacking midfielder or forward for Azerbaijani club Sabah.

Career

Barcelona 
Ceballos joined Barcelona's La Masia youth facility at the age of 11. In 2007, he became a YouTube sensation after being filmed juggling the ball with Ronaldinho. He progressed through the youth system but was impeded by injuries. In 2004, he took part in the Torneo Nacional Alevín de Fútbol in Brunete for Barcelona's U-12 side where he scored 8 goals and won the trophy for the tournament's best player. Having been released from his contract at Barcelona in 2010, Ceballos trained with Chelsea in March 2011.

Tottenham Hotspur
Following a trial, Tottenham Hotspur completed the signing of Ceballos on 11 July 2011. He was named on the substitutes bench for a League Cup tie at Stoke City on 20 September. During his first season at the club he was a regular in the Spurs XI reserve team, scoring 10 goals in 13 appearances.

For the 2012–13 season Ceballos was selected in the provisional squad and was given the number 44 shirt. He played for Tottenham's U21 side in the new Barclays U21 Premier League and scored a hat-trick against Southampton in a 4–2 win. He also netted a brace against Liverpool in the Elite Group of the league on 1 April 2013.

On 2 September 2013, Ceballos joined newly promoted Portuguese Primeira Liga side Arouca on loan and was given the number 11 shirt. On 20 September, he made his professional debut; coming on as a 63rd-minute substitute in a 1–0 loss to Braga.

Ahead of the 2014–15 season Ceballos was given the number 39 shirt and was a regular on the substitutes bench, including for the 2–1 victory against Hull City in November. He was released by Tottenham Hotspur at the end of the season.

Later career 
On 23 July 2015, Ceballos joined Charlton Athletic on a three-year deal.

On 1 August 2016, Ceballos joined Sint-Truidense V.V. on a season-long loan.

References

External links 
 
 
 
 

1992 births
Living people
Spanish footballers
Association football midfielders
Spanish expatriate footballers
Tottenham Hotspur F.C. players
F.C. Arouca players
Charlton Athletic F.C. players
Sint-Truidense V.V. players
Al-Wakrah SC players
Qatar SC players
Sabah FC (Azerbaijan) players
Primeira Liga players
English Football League players
Belgian Pro League players
Qatar Stars League players
Spanish expatriate sportspeople in England
Expatriate footballers in England
Spanish expatriate sportspeople in Portugal
Expatriate footballers in Portugal
Spanish expatriate sportspeople in Qatar
Expatriate footballers in Qatar
Spanish expatriate sportspeople in Azerbaijan
Expatriate footballers in Azerbaijan